The Kyocera KX16, sometimes referred to as the Kyocera Candid, is the first clamshell-style camera phone from Kyocera. Features include:
 VGA (640x480) camera with LED flash and self-timer
 LCD color display with 128x128 pixels supporting 65,000 colors
 BREW downloadable games
 EMS and picture messaging
 Monochrome external display
 500-name internal address book

Other technical data include:
 Form Factor: Clamshell
 Stub Antenna
 Battery Life: Talk: 3.50 hours, Standby: 170 hours (7.1 days)

The Kyocera KX16 is a relatively basic CDMA phone with a digital camera, speakerphone and voice-dialing. It's an above-average phone for entry-level users.

Carriers
The phone has been distributed in North America by the following carriers:
 Alltel (U.S.)
 US Cellular (U.S.)
 Cricket Communications (U.S.)

External links
Kyocera Candid KX16 official page
Kyocera KX16 user reviews at PhoneScoop

Kyocera mobile phones